Panghyon Airport (also written Banghyon airfield) is an airport near Panghyŏn-dong in Kusong, Pyongan-bukto, North Korea.

Facilities 
The airfield has a single concrete runway 13/31, measuring 8500 x 180 feet (3277 x 55 m).  It has a full-length parallel taxiway and other taxiways leading to hangars.  Earth revetments are located along the parallel taxiway.  Some aeronautical charts show a second north–south runway; however it may just be a taxiway.

Missile Base 

In December 2016, U.S. analysts reported that a missile base had been constructed approximately 13 miles from the airport, and was possibly the site for Hwasong-10 missiles tests in October. It is also the site of North Korea's first successful test-launch of the Hwasong-14, the country's first intercontinental ballistic missile, on July 4, 2017.

References 

Airports in North Korea
North Pyongan